John Henry McMahon  (October 15, 1869 – December 30, 1894) was a Major League Baseball first baseman and catcher. He played in 51 games, with a .243 batting average, for the New York Giants of the National League in 1892 and 1893.

Sources

Major League Baseball first basemen
Major League Baseball catchers
New York Giants (NL) players
Baseball players from Connecticut
1869 births
1894 deaths
19th-century baseball players
Bridgeport Giants players
Grand Rapids Shamrocks players
St. Paul Apostles players
Duluth Whalebacks players
Kansas City Cowboys (minor league) players
Sportspeople from Waterbury, Connecticut
Manistee (minor league baseball) players